The Asia-Pacific Rugby League Confederation (APRLC) is an umbrella body for nations playing the sport of rugby league football in the Southern Hemisphere. The Confederation aims to act as a counterpart to the Rugby League European Federation.

History
The formation of the APRLC was agreed at the Rugby League International Federation's annual general meeting in May 2010. The Federation was established with 7 founding full members. The APRLC is based at the New Zealand Rugby League's Auckland headquarters and will focus much of its efforts on developing the sport in the Pacific Islands. Under the new RLIF constitution agreed in 2010, the APRLC may appoint a delegate to the five-person International Federation executive.

In 2011, the Asia-Pacific Rugby League Confederation met in a meeting in Auckland over December 5–6. At the meeting the chairman of the Fiji National Rugby League Peni Musunamasi has been elected as a director to represent the Asia Pacific region on the Rugby League International Federation which has been labelled a "significant milestone for the sport". Amongst many issues that were discussed at the two- day meeting was the application for membership of the federation from India, Philippines, Tahiti, Tokelau and American Samoa that shows the growing popularity of the sport in the region.

Competitions

Pacific Rugby League International

The Pacific Rugby League International is a series of rugby league test matches that have been played during the National Rugby League's annual representative weekend since 2013.

They consist of the Melanesian Cup, played between Papua New Guinea and Fiji, and the Polynesian Cup, between Tonga and Samoa.

Members

Full Members

Affiliate Members

Observer Members

Official APRL Rankings
The Official Asia Pacific Rugby League Confederation Rankings are calculated on each nation’s performance over the current season and are influenced by a nation’s official RLIF ranking.

Influencers of position include:
 The result of the match i.e. win, lose or draw
 The margin of victory (or defeat)
 The relative strength of opposition faced
 The date of the match – more recent matches are weighted more heavily
 The importance of the match e.g. a World Cup match is given greater weighting than a standalone international.
 Official RLIF World Ranking

Rankings as of December 2018

Asia Pacific Rugby League World Cup results

Men's

Women's

See also

International Rugby League
Rugby League European Federation

References

External links

Rugby league in Oceania
Rugby league governing bodies in Oceania
Sports organizations established in 2010